Sailing competitions at the 2007 Pan American Games in Rio de Janeiro was held in July 2011 at the Marina da Gloria.

Men's events

Women's events

Open events

References

P
2007
Events at the 2007 Pan American Games
Sailing competitions in Brazil